The Minister of Defence of Georgia is the head of the Ministry of Defence of Georgia, the governmental body of Georgia in charge of the Defense Forces of Georgia and regulating activities in defence of the country from external threats, preserving territorial integrity and waging wars on behalf of Georgia.

The current minister is Juansher Burchuladze, who was appointed on February 22, 2021.

List of ministers

Ministers of War of the Democratic Republic of Georgia (1918–1921)
 Grigol Giorgadze, May 26, 1918 – February 13, 1919
 Noe Ramishvili, February 14, 1919 – December 1919
 Grigol Lordkipanidze, January 1920 – September 23, 1920
 Ilia Odishelidze, (acting), September 23, 1920 – November 10, 1920
 Parmen Chichinadze, November 10, 1920 – February 25, 1921

People's Commissar for Military and Naval Affairs of the Georgian SSR (1921–1923)
 Shalva Eliava, September 15, 1921 – November 14, 1923

Ministers of Defense of the Republic of Georgia (From 1991)

 Joni Pirtskhalaishvili, September 15, 1991 – January 2, 1992
 Levan Sharashenidze, January 2, 1992 – May 8, 1992
 Tengiz Kitovani, May 8, 1992 – May 5, 1993
 Giorgi Karkarashvili, May 6, 1993 – February 11, 1994
 Eduard Shevardnadze (acting), February 11, 1994 – April 25, 1994
 Varden Nadibaidze, April 25, 1994 – April 27, 1998
 David Tevzadze, April 28, 1998 – February 17, 2004

Ministers of Defense of Georgia (From 2004)
 Gela Bezhuashvili, February 17, 2004 – June 10, 2004
 Giorgi Baramidze, June 10, 2004 – December 17, 2004
 Irakli Okruashvili, December 17, 2004 – November 10, 2006
 David Kezerashvili, November 10, 2006 – December 9, 2008
 Vasil Sikharulidze, December 9, 2008 – August 27, 2009
 Bachana Akhalaia, August 27, 2009 – July 4, 2012
 Dimitri Shashkin, July 4, 2012 – October 25, 2012
 Irakli Alasania, October 25, 2012 – November 4, 2014
 Mindia Janelidze, November 4, 2014 – May 1, 2015
 Tinatin Khidasheli, May 1, 2015 – August 1, 2016
 Levan Izoria, August 1, 2016 – September 8, 2019
 Irakli Garibashvili – September 8, 2019 – February 22, 2021
 Juansher Burchuladze – February, 22 2021 – present

References 

Georgia
.F